The Path of Thorns (Terms) is a hit song by singer-songwriter Sarah McLachlan from her album, Solace. It was her first top-forty chart hit in her native Canada, and the 50 millionth song purchased from the iTunes Store. The original music video for this song shows a couple dancing but is distinguished by the fact McLachlan was filmed performing the song nude.

Track listings
Cassette (Nettwerk / Canada)
 "The Path of Thorns (Terms) [Radio Edit]"
 "The Path of Thorns (Terms) [Album Version]"

CD (Nettwerk / Canada)
 "The Path of Thorns (Terms) [Radio Edit]"
 "The Path of Thorns (Terms) [Album Version]"
 "Shelter [Violin mix]"

Promo CD (Arista / U.S.)
 "The Path of Thorns (Terms) [Brian Malouf Radio remix]"
 "The Path of Thorns (Terms) [Album Edit]"

Charts

Weekly charts

Year-end charts

References

External links
 (licensed content by Sony BMG)

1991 singles
Sarah McLachlan songs
Arista Records singles
Songs written by Sarah McLachlan
1991 songs
Nettwerk Records singles